Ioana Pârvulescu (born 1960) is a Romanian writer. She was born in Brașov and studied at the University of Bucharest. She graduated in 1983 and went on to complete a PhD in literature in 1999. She teaches modern literature at the same university.

She has worked at the literary journal România literară, and has translated the works of Maurice Nadeau, Angelus Silesius and Rainer Maria Rilke. She is a member of the Romanian Writers' Union. In 2013 Pârvulescu won the EU Prize for Literature for her book Viața începe vineri (Life Begins on Friday). In 2018 she won the professional prize at the European Union Prize for Literature writing contest for her work of short fiction "A Voice". 

Two of her most recent books Inocenții/The Innocents(2016) and Prevestirea/The Prophecy (2020) are being translated by Alistair Ian Blyth and will be published at Istros Books.

Bibliography

 Viața începe vineri, Humanitas, 2009 translated as Life begins on Friday by Alistair Ian Blyth, Istros Books, 2016.
 Viitorul începe luni("The Future Begins on Monday"), Humanitas, 2012.
 Inocenții ("The Innocents"), Humanitas, 2016.
 Prevestirea ("The Prophecy"), Humanitas, 2020.

References

1960 births
People from Brașov
Living people
University of Bucharest alumni
21st-century Romanian women writers
Romanian women novelists
Romanian women academics
21st-century Romanian novelists
Romanian translators